Anthony John James Bailey,  (born 13 January 1970) is a British public relations consultant.

Personal life and background

Bailey was born in London on 13 January 1970 and brought up in Ruislip. His father, Colin, was an engineer and instructor at FÁS, an Irish state body responsible for training the unemployed. Before entering public relations, Bailey sold men's suits.

Public relations 

Bailey is chairman of Anthony Bailey Consulting, a public relations company. Previous positions include being chairman of his own company Eligo International, and a senior account director for communications firm Burson-Marsteller, which he joined in 1993. Eligo Consulting was dissolved in January 2016 with their final accounts showing funds of -£85,000. Anthony Bailey Consulting did not trade until 2016, and in accounts posted that year showed liabilities of more than £40,000.

Anthony Bailey Consulting was dissolved  by order of Companies House in October 2020. Its most recent accounts from 2018 showed it had built up losses of more than £220,000.

Bailey is a member of the Chartered Institute of Public Relations.

In 2007 The Observer referred to Bailey as a "PR guru who is one of the most influential men you have never heard of" and "a key player in the world of Catholic and Middle East politics." Bailey's descriptions of his own occupation have included "Public Relations Consultant" (2010), "Royal And Diplomatic Consultant" (2011), and "Head R. Order of Knighthood" (2004).

Politics 

Bailey was co-president of the think-tank British Influence and a supporter of Britain's membership of both the European Union and the Commonwealth. He was a supporter of the Conservative Party until 1999 from which time he aligned himself with the Labour Party. He made a substantial donation to the failed leadership campaign of David Miliband in 2010.

In 2005, it emerged that a £500,000 donation Bailey had made to the Labour party had been rejected by its chief fundraiser, Lord Levy, who allegedly feared the money had come from foreign businessmen. Bailey insisted the money was his own and issued legal proceedings. He later said: "The Labour party has apologised unreservedly for any distress that the affair caused". A subsequent donation of £50,000 was accepted.

New version of a royal order of knighthood 

In the 1990s, Bailey "revived" the so-called "Delegation for Great Britain and Ireland of the Sacred Military Constantinian Order of Saint George", under the authority of Prince Carlo, Duke of Castro, who is the "Franco-Neapolitan branch" claimant to the headship of the House of Bourbon-Two Sicilies. (The House of Bourbon-Two Sicilies has controlled no territory since the Kingdom of the Two Sicilies was suppressed in 1860. Since 1960 the headship of the House has been disputed.) In 2009 Bailey was appointed "magistral delegate" of the Delegation, and the organisation has awarded him other honours. Bailey has never been an officer or member of the long-established version of the Order, which is under the authority of Prince Pedro, Duke of Calabria, the "Hispano-Neapolitan branch" claimant to the House of Bourbon-Two Sicilies. The longstanding version of the Order has no connection with Bailey, nor with his business activities, nor with the order of which he is described as "delegate".

In December 2020, Bailey resigned from all the roles he held in his branch of the Constantinian Order, citing its impact on his "physical and mental health."

Charity activities

Bailey was appointed in 1999 as executive chairman of the Saudi organization "Painting & Patronage". (The UK company "Painting and Patronage" was dissolved in 2014.) In 2012, Bailey was a director of the United Learning Trust. He was, until 2016, a director of St Mary's University.

In 2016, Bailey was appointed President of the Executive Council of the Portuguese Centenary Appeal. He is also a Patron of the Faiths Forum for London.

Controversies 

In 1995 police recorded his telephone conversations with a client, who claimed to be a Libyan prince. Bailey was accused of blackmailing the client, but the case was dismissed before it got to court. Bailey complained to the Press Complaints Commission about the way this was reported in the Daily Mail in 2010; in resolution, the PCC negotiated a statement from the Mail that it had omitted some details in reporting these circumstances, and that it apologised for any distress caused.

Bailey claimed to be Ambassador-at-Large for The Gambia between 2004 and 2007, though the Gambian High Commission in London said at the time that they don't know much about him and "He has no office here".

According to the Prime Minister of Grenada, Keith Mitchell, Bailey asked to be made the country's ambassador to the Holy See, which Mitchell rejected.

Antiguan and Grenadian honours granted and removed

In 2014, Bailey was appointed Knight Grand Cross of the Most Distinguished Order of the Nation, by the Governor-General of Antigua and Barbuda. In May 2016, the British tabloid The Mail on Sunday reported that Bailey was accused of incorrectly using an Antiguan knighthood as if it were a British title. (Since 1813 Buckingham Palace and the Foreign Office have not allowed the use of titles from foreign knighthoods in the United Kingdom by British citizens.)

Bailey also stated that he had Antiguan citizenship on the basis of his Antiguan passport, issued when he was appointed as their special economic envoy to the European Union in 2015. The Antiguan government did confirm that Bailey's passport inaccurately stated that he is a national of Antigua and Barbuda. However, Bailey was never granted Antiguan citizenship, whether by investment or otherwise.

The British firm that prints the passports apparently assumed that anyone to be issued an Antigua and Barbuda passport would be a national of that country, and they were not informed that this did not apply to Bailey. Bailey's knighthood and his appointment as an economic envoy then became subject to review by the Antiguan Governor General. On 21 July 2017 his Antiguan knighthood was annulled.

Bailey was granted a Grenadian knighthood in 2015. The government of Grenada reviewed this grant and took legal advice; the knighthood was rescinded in August 2016. In December 2016 Private Eye reported that Bailey's lawyers were issuing legal warning letters to any Caribbean local newspapers which had reported on the knighthood controversies.

Divorce and committal to prison

On 1 February 2022 the High Court in London made an order committing Bailey to prison for 12 months for contempt of court. The order followed an application by his ex-wife, over Bailey's failure to comply with a court order relating to the couple's divorce settlement, which included a half-share of his villa in Portugal. The judge, Mr Justice Peel, said that Bailey had been "obstructing the court at almost every possible opportunity, deploying numerous tactical and forensic ploys to attempt to delay the process, and divert attention from his grossly culpable conduct". His behaviour "displays dishonesty, wilful obstruction, and barefaced contempt for the court process, all to avoid paying that which is owed to his former wife. It is a shameful spectacle deserving of considerable opprobrium." Bailey is believed to be in Portugal (in January 2022 he claimed to be too ill to travel, but he had made seven trips to Spain, Germany, Rome, and the US between June 2021 and January 2022, and the judge on this occasion, Sir Jonathan Cohen, discovered that he was actually in Florida). and the committal to prison will only take effect if he returns to the United Kingdom.

Awards 

1st Class of the Syrian Order of Outstanding Merit (2003)

 Knight Grand Cross of the Order of Saint Sylvester - July 2009; Knight Commander - 2004

 Knight Grand Cross of the Equestrian Order of the Holy Sepulchre of Jerusalem (GCHS) - July 2017.

 Officer of the Order of the British Empire (OBE) - 2008, "for his services to inter-religious relations and charity."

 Grand Officer of the Order of San Carlos - 2008, in a reciprocal arrangement whereby Bailey's Order and Colombian authorities gifted awards to each other.

 Sternberg Interfaith Gold Medallion - 2012

Revoked honours

 Knight Grand Cross of the Order of the Nation of Grenada – Awarded in 2015, revoked in 2016.

 Governor General of Grenada's Medal of Honour (in Gold) – Awarded in 2015, revoked in 2016.

 Knight Grand Cross of the Most Distinguished Order of the Nation of Antigua – Awarded in 2014, revoked in 2017.

Publications 

 "How do we tell the real story?", pp. 61–69 in Having Faith in Foreign Policy, London, (2007)

References

External links 

 Anthony Bailey Consulting

1970 births
Living people
People from Ruislip
Businesspeople from London
British public relations people
British Roman Catholics
People stripped of a British Commonwealth honour

Knights of the Order of St. Sylvester
Officers of the Order of the British Empire